Fukui Prefectural Ichijodani Asakura Family Site Museum (福井県立一乗谷朝倉氏遺跡資料館, ふくいけんりつ いちじょうだに あさくらし いせき しりょうかん）is a historical museum located in Fukui City, Fukui Prefecture, Japan. Asakura clan, a feudal lord in the Sengoku period, had their castle in the Ichijodani (Ichijo Valley), which was burnt down by Oda Nobunaga. The museum carries a collection of excavated remains from the valley and focuses on the history of the clan as well as living around the time.

Overview 
The museum is located in the eastern part of Fukui City, Fukui Prefecture.  It is a historical museum featuring the Echizen Asakura clan, which flourished in Echizen Province　(present-day eastern Fukui Prefecture). The Asakura clan established its territory in the area in 1471 during the Sengoku Period and had a castle in Ichijodani. However, the castle and the town was later burnt down to ash by Oda Nobunaga.  The museum opened in 1981.  It is temporally closed until October, 2022 when the new museum building will open to public in adjacent block.

The museum exhibits a 3D model of the terrain, a reconstructed model of Yoshikage Asakura's castle, and excavated remains such as ceramics, stone, wood, and metal objects from Ichijodani.  It covers the history of Asakura Clan as well as the life of people during the days (religion, housing, food, daily goods, etc.). In addition to the permanent exhibition, the museum holds special exhibitions and publishes books.

Cultural Properties

Important Cultural Properties 
The following goods excavated from Ichijodani are designated as Important Cultural Properties by Japanese government.

Ceramic and clay artifacts: 1,246 items
Glassware 1 item
Wooden artifacts: 267 items
Wooden letter and ink-writing wooden products: 184 items
Lacquerware: 28 items
Stoneware 144 items
Metalware 456 items
Bone and antler ware: 12 items
Cloth remnants: 2 items
Ink stick: 1 item
Paper: 1 piece
Carbonized rice: 1 item

Access 
 Take JR Etsumi-Hoku Line from Fukui Station and get off at Ichijōdani Station.  A few min walk from the station.
 Free shuttle bus Asakura-Yumemaru from/to the center of Ichijodani excavation site is also available on weekends.

Relate Pages 
 Asakura clan
 Ichijōdani Asakura Family Historic Ruins

References

Museums established in 1981
Museums in Fukui Prefecture
Fukui (city)